The 1979–80 European Cup was the 15th edition of the European Cup, IIHF's premier European club ice hockey tournament. The season started on October 11, 1979, and finished on August 24, 1980.

The tournament was won by CSKA Moscow, who won the final group.

First round

 Kölner EC,  
 SC Bern,  
 HK Olimpija Ljubljana,   
 Flyers Heerenveen   :  bye

Second round

 Tappara,   
 Modo,  
 Slovan Bratislava,  
 CSKA Moscow    :  bye

Third round

Final Group
(Innsbruck, Austria)

Final group standings

References
 Season 1980

1979–80 in European ice hockey
IIHF European Cup